Early general elections were held in the Netherlands on 12 September 2012 after Prime Minister Mark Rutte handed in his government's resignation to Queen Beatrix on 23 April. The 150 seats of the House of Representatives of the Netherlands were contested using party-list proportional representation. The People's Party for Freedom and Democracy (VVD) received a plurality of the votes, followed by the Labour Party (PvdA).

Prior to the election, polls had predicted an increase in support for the Socialist Party, primarily at the expense of the PvdA, but the PvdA regained support during the campaign, which was attributed to the leadership of Diederik Samsom and in the election the Socialist Party failed to improve its performance. The Party for Freedom (PVV) and Christian Democratic Appeal (CDA) both lost seats.

After 49 days of negotiations, a new VVD-PvdA centrist government was formed on 5 November 2012, comprising Mark Rutte as prime minister along with 7 VVD ministers and 6 PvdA ministers.

It was the first Netherlands-wide election in which the Caribbean Netherlands participated.

Background

Prime Minister Mark Rutte's government fell after the Party for Freedom (PVV), which had supported the government from outside, refused to sanction the austerity measures the government sought in April 2012. This called for a new early election to be held in September 2012. It is the fourth early election in a row since the Second Kok cabinet fell very near the end of its mandate, which allowed that government to keep the election date to be held as scheduled by the term in May 2002. Early elections were subsequently held in January 2003, November 2006, June 2010 and September 2012. And during that time a total of five governments ended prematurely, as it was possible for the Third Balkenende cabinet (July–November 2006) to be formed without a new election.

Participating parties
In addition to the established parties of Dutch politics, the pensioners' party 50PLUS, founded in 2009, won its first seats in the election.

The Pirate Party claimed that it may enter parliament for the first time with 2 or 3 seats. However, the party achieved only 0.3% of the national vote and no seats.

Hero Brinkman, elected on the Party for Freedom's list, split from the party in March 2012 and founded the Independent Citizens' Party in April 2012 to run in the election on his own. In June 2012, the party merged with Proud of the Netherlands (a party founded by Rita Verdonk, who had resigned from the position of party leader) to form the Democratic Political Turning Point, with Brinkman as leader. The party achieved 0.1% of the national vote and no seats.

Polls

Natixis evaluated on 6 September the most recent opinion polls, and found the likelihood was strongest for the formation of a "purple government" of the pro-EU parties: VVD, CDA, D66, PvdA and, possible GL. It also pointed to other potential governing coalition that would include a pro-austerity government with VVD, CDA, D66, GL and CU; or a centre-left government of CDA, D66, GL and PvdA with a minority of seats, but with outside parliamentary support of the SP. The two largest eurosceptic parties, PVV and SP, are reportedly not interested in building a coalition. A similar scenario to the previous election could re-occur, considering no pre-election alliance will receive votes enough for majority, and thus needs to form a new more broad coalition government, comprising at least three parties.

Pre-election agreements
On 27 April, the two governing coalition parties, VVD and CDA negotiated a deal to reduce the national deficit in 2013 to an acceptable level below 3% of GDP. This deal was also supported by the three opposition parties: D66, GL and the CU.

A ratification of the newly signed Fiscal Compact is unconditionally supported by the four parties: VVD, CDA, D66 and GL. The compact is however opposed by the three parties: PVV, CU and SP, while the PvdA, will only support it provided that the European Commission first grant the Netherlands a two-year exemption to comply, due to the existence of "extraordinary economic circumstances."

Campaign

The VVD's Mark Rutte is said to be aligned with German Chancellor Angela Merkel in promoting austerity measures, while his closest rival the PvdA's Diederik Samsom's was said to reflect French President Francois Hollande's stimulus measures from its own election this year. A final television debate took place on 11 September, with the economy reportedly the most important issue amongst voters. The day before the debate, Rutte said that he would stop delegating ever increasing powers to the European Union saying: "I am 'Mr No' when it comes to a Brussels that's expanding more and more." Conversely, Samsom said that he was in coordination with Hollande over dealing with the economic crisis. Support for him and the PvdA grew after he was perceived as having the better performance in the debates. He also rejected taking cabinet posts in a coalition government saying: "I will either be prime minister, or I will lead my party in parliament." The vote was also seen as a test of the EU's popularity within the country.

Political analyst Anno Bunnik said that many voters were not keen on repeated early elections. He also pointed to PVV's Geert Wilders' declining popularity after he was viewed as a political opportunist not looking out for the national interest in effectively forcing a snap election. In citing Wilders' labeling as a "sorcerer's apprentice," he also pointed to a possible first-ever loss of seats for the PVV under Wilder's helm. He attributed this to Wilders' inefficiency in the debates of responding to the other party leaders instead of setting the agenda, instead in one debate he got into an argument with Rutte with both leaders calling each other liars in an unprecedented move.

Though opinion polls indicated a close race to gain a majority, the international media indicated a left-leaning government was likely to emerge as a result of the election. However, the French election was cited and countered as a turn in orientation for the government would still not lead to a change in austerity policies.

Results

There was a turn-out of 74.6%, about one percent less than the previous election two years before. The NOS reported the following results after 100% of the votes were counted:

 The VVD won the most votes (26.6%), accruing 41 seats (an increase of 10).
 The PvdA was second (24.8%), accruing 38 seats (an increase of 8).
 The PVV was third (10.1%), with 15 seats (a loss of nine, down from 24 seats), and obtained the same number of seats as the SP (15).
 The GL lost six of its ten seats and just under two-thirds of their voters.

The Kiesraad announced the final results on 17 September.

By province

Government formation
In earlier times it was the sole task of the King (or Queen) to appoint a person to prepare the formation of a new cabinet (in Dutch, informateur). The House of Representatives however changed the election law in the spring of 2012, so that the party with a plurality of votes now is responsible first to appoint a "verkenner" (scout), who after interviewing all party leaders submits a report to the House of Representatives, with a recommendation of who should be appointed as "informateur" and on what formation his first negotiation attempt should be.

On 13 September the VVD appointed Henk Kamp, the VVD's Minister of Social Affairs and Employment, as "scout". He held formal individual interviews with all party leaders the following day, where they were asked about their support and priorities for the formation of a new government.

Overview of some possible majority coalitions:
 VVD + PvdA1: 79 seats in the lower house, but with no majority in the Senate.
 VVD + PvdA + CDA: 92 seats in the lower house, and a majority in the Senate.
 VVD + PvdA + CDA + D66: 104 seats in the lower house, and a majority in the Senate.
 VVD + PvdA + D66 (Purple)1: 91 seats in the lower house, but with no majority in the Senate.
 VVD + PvdA + D66 + GL (Purple +): 95 seats in the lower house, and a majority in the Senate.
 PvdA + SP + CDA + D66 (Centre-Left): 78 seats in the lower house, and a majority in the Senate.
 VVD + PVV + CDA + CU + SGP (Right): 77 seats in the lower house, and a majority in the Senate.
 PvdA + SP + D66 + CU + GL + PvdD (Left)1: 76 seats, but with no majority in the Senate.
 VVD + CDA + D66 + CU + GL + SGP ("Kunduz" with SGP)2: 78 seats, and a majority in the Senate.

Party leaders' stated opinions on 14 September, about government formation:
 VVD: Wants first to negotiate a possible formation with PvdA, and then invite all other parties to join (except for SP or PVV).
 PvdA: Wants first to negotiate a possible formation with VVD, and then invite all other parties to join (except for PVV). If it is not possible to form a government with VVD, they want to form a center-left government with SP.
 PVV: Wants to be in opposition, no matter what.
 SP: Wants to be in opposition against any form of PvdA+VVD government. Is only interested to form a center-left government with PvdA, D66 and CDA.
 CDA: Their first priority is a VVD+PvdA government with the possible add of additional parties. If a compromise between VVD and PvdA is indeed reachable, then CDA wants to negotiate with a representative from both parties, about the possibility also to join such a government. This official position was confirmed and supported by the CDA party board on 17 September, ignoring a fraction of the party advocating the party instead should have opted for opposition – no matter what.
 D66: Their first priority is a VVD+PvdA government with the possible add of additional parties. If a compromise between VVD and PvdA is indeed reachable, then D66 wants to negotiate with a representative from VVD, about the possibility also to join such a government.
 CU: Wants a PvdA and VVD government within maximum two months, with the possible add of additional parties.
 GL: Wants a PvdA and VVD government. Decided to be in opposition.
 SGP: Wants a PvdA and VVD government, and would prefer if the CDA join such a government as a third party, as this would give them a majority in both houses and bind the government together "like cement".
 PvdD: Suggests that VVD first attempts to form a government with "like-minded" parties (not including PvdA). If that fails, then PvdA should attempt to form a government with "like minded" parties (not including VVD). And only if both of those two attempts fails, then and only then, the third option "to form any kind of VVD+PvdA government" should be attempted.
 50+: Wants a PvdA and VVD government, with the possible add of additional parties.

Henk Kamp confirmed the above press statements in his "scout report" on 18 September, and recommended the House of Representatives to appoint him and Wouter Bos (PvdA) as the two leading negotiators ("informateurs") in an attempt to form a new government comprising the VVD and the PvdA. He emphasized that it was entirely up to those two parties to decide if they wanted to invite additional parties to join such a government, as the two parties together had a majority in the House of Representatives, but did not need a majority in the Senate to form a stable government.

During a debate in the House of Representatives on 20 September, both the VVD and the PvdA announced they now preferred to establish a two-party government, rather than a wider coalition of more parties. They admitted this was a new stance from their initial statements from 14 September. This change of opinion was criticized in particular by D66 and CDA, but along with the appointment of Henk Kamp (VVD) and Wouter Bos (PvdA) as "informateurs", the proposal that the two parties now should negotiate the formation of a two-party government was passed by a majority in the House of Representatives.

Negotiations between the two parties started officially on 21 September. No official announcements were made during negotiations, but it was leaked from sources within the VVD on 24 September that if negotiations continued to go well, they expected it was possible to present the new two-party government within six to eight weeks. In regards of the budget for 2013, it was decided by the VVD and the PvdA to delay debating it in the House, until the point of time a new government had been formed, as it was considered to be one of the important negotiation points for the new government first to settle a deal on. On 1 October 2012, a partial agreement was sealed between VVD and PvdA for the 2013 budget, adjusting the previous 5-party spring agreement at several key points, but accepting that the overall budget deficit should remain being cut to only 2.7% of the GDP. The parties accepted for a debate and vote on the new agreement straight away, as the time was an issue, and there was no reason to wait for the lengthy negotiations first to end between VVD and PvdA on the overall government formation. Both VVD and PvdA stated they were happy now to have closed the partial budget agreement, but also admitted that government formation negotiations would probably last for several additional weeks, before a VVD-PvdA government potentially could be formed.

After two more weeks of negotiations the following three deals were also agreed: 1.) A new loan scheme for students is to be introduced on 1 January 2014. 2.) Officials are no longer allowed to refuse to marry same-sex couples 3.) Municipalities will get the freedom to decide whether stores open on Sundays.
 
The negotiations for the government formation ended with a final agreement and a list of newly proposed ministers on 29 October, which was subsequently endorsed by VVD on 2 November and PvdA on 3 November. The new government comprising Mark Rutte as prime minister along with 7 VVD ministers and 6 PvdA ministers, were sworn in by Queen Beatrix on 5 November 2012. It was only the third cabinet since 1918 (the first two being the cabinets helmed by Wim Kok from 1994 to 2002) without a minister from a Christian Democratic party, following the decline of the former major party CDA.

See also
 List of members of the House of Representatives of the Netherlands, 2012–2017
 List of Christian Democratic Appeal candidates in the 2012 Dutch general election

References

2012
2012
2012 elections in the Caribbean
2012
2012
2012 elections in the Netherlands
September 2012 events in Europe